The houbara bustard (Chlamydotis undulata), also known as African houbara, is a relatively small bustard native to North Africa, where it lives in arid habitats. The global population is listed as Vulnerable on the IUCN Red List since 2014. There is a population in the Canary Islands which has been assessed as Near Threatened in 2015.

It is dull brown with black markings on the wings, a greyish neck and a black ruff along the side of the neck. Males are larger and heavier than females.

Description
The houbara bustard is a small to mid-sized bustard. It is brown above and white below, with a black stripe down the sides of its neck. In flight, the long wings show large areas of black and brown on the flight feathers.

Taxonomy
Psophia undulata was the scientific name proposed by Joseph Franz von Jacquin in 1784 who described a houbara brought from Tripoli to Vienna's Tiergarten Schönbrunn.
Otis macqueenii was proposed by John Edward Gray in 1832 for a bustard from India drawn by Thomas Hardwicke.
The African houbara was subordinated to the genus Chlamydotis by René Lesson in 1839.
Houbara fuertaventurae was proposed by Walter Rothschild and Ernst Hartert in 1894 for a houbara from Fuerteventura island.

MacQueen's bustard was long regarded a subspecies of the African houbara. It was proposed as a distinct species in 2003 because of differences in plumage, vocalizations and courtship behaviour.
The British Ornithologists' Union's Taxonomic Records Committee's decision to accept this split has been questioned on the grounds that the differences in the male courtship displays may be functionally trivial, and would not prevent interbreeding, whereas a difference in a pre-copulation display would indicate that the two are separate species. The committee responded to this scepticism, by explaining that there are differences in both courtship and pre-copulation displays.

Phylogeny 

Results of analysis of mitochondrial DNA sequences of 73 Chlamydotis samples indicates that the houbara bustard and MacQueen's bustard genetically diverged around 430,000 years ago from a common ancestor. The divergence between the African and Canarian houbara was estimated at around 20,000 to 25,000 years ago.

Distribution and habitat
The houbara bustard is found in North Africa west of the Nile, mainly in the western part of the Sahara desert region in Mauritania, Morocco, Algeria, Tunisia, Libya, Pakistan and Egypt. Some old records exist from Sudan as well. A small population is found in the Canary Islands. The Asian houbara or MacQueen's bustard which was earlier included in this species occurs east of the Sinai Peninsula. The North African species is sedentary unlike the migratory northern populations of MacQueen's bustards.

The subspecies fuertaventurae of the Canary Islands is highly restricted and endangered. A 1997 survey found a total population of about 500 birds.

Behaviour and ecology

Breeding

Like other bustards, this species has a flamboyant display raising the white feathers of the head and neck and withdrawing the head. Two to four eggs are laid on the ground. It hardly ever uses its voice.

Feeding
This species is omnivorous, taking seeds, insects and other small creatures.

Threats
In North Africa, the houbara bustard is hunted by falconers and by hunters with guns. The populations declined in the two decades before 2004, but have been increasing since.

Conservation 
The International Fund for Houbara Conservation  is the global leader in Houbara bustard conservation. A global conservation strategy was developed and implemented over the past forty years with the objective of ensuring the species has a sustainable future in the wild through effective and appropriate conservation programmes and management plans.

Since 1995, the conservation strategy adopted consists of an integrated approach combining sound ecology, protection measures in the wild, conservation breeding, and effective reinforcement programmes.

The IHFC was created in 2006 to further the original programme by managing international assets and securing partnerships across the range of the houbara, which encourage sustainable practices to ensure the species’ conservation.

The Houbara conservation programme is supported by the government of Abu Dhabi. A multi-faceted Houbara conservation strategy  has established breeding centers in the UAE (The National Avian Research Center and The Sheik Khalifa Houbara Breeding Center), Morocco (Emirates Center for Wildlife Propagation) and Kazakhstan (The Sheik Khalifa Houbara Breeding Center) to captive-breed Houbara and increase wild populations of the bird in its natural habitat across entire species range. In 2019, the International Fund for Houbara Conservation bred 484,351 Houbara and released more than 343,428 Houbara into the wild.

The International Foundation for Conservation and Development of Wildlife (IFCDW) is a major conservation and breeding project established with funds from Prince Sultan Bin Abdul-Aziz Al Saud and based near Agadir, Morocco. The centre releases captive bred populations to boost wild populations.

References

Further reading
 
 
 Release of Houbara back to nature

External links 

 BirdLife Species Factsheet.
 National Avian Research Centre
 International Fund for Houbara Conservation (IFHC)

houbara bustard
Birds of North Africa
houbara bustard